Vinland Saga may refer to:

Norse colonization of North America
Vinland sagas, two Icelandic documents detailing the discovery and exploration of Vinland by Erik the Red
Vinland Saga (manga), a 2005 manga by Makoto Yukimura about Thorfinn, the Viking explorer of North America
Vinland Saga (album), the second album of the symphonic metal band Leaves' Eyes

See also

 
 Vinland (disambiguation)
 Saga (disambiguation)